Richard Day Lenton (1804 – 9 September 1870) was an English cricketer who was associated with Cambridge Town Club and made his first-class debut in 1828.

References

1804 births
1870 deaths
English cricketers
English cricketers of 1826 to 1863
Cambridge Town Club cricketers